Thomas Lake (1567–1630) was an English politician.

Thomas Lake may also refer to:

People
Thomas Lake (died 1606), English politician
Thomas Lake (died 1653), English MP for Wells

Lakes
Thomas Lake (Annapolis)
Thomas Lake (Halifax)
Thomas Lake, a lake in Le Sueur County, Minnesota
Thomas Lake (Portage County, Wisconsin)

See also

Lake Thomas

Lake, Thomas